The R510 road is a regional road in Ireland which links the N69 road and the R526 regional road in County Limerick.

See also 

 Roads in Ireland
 National primary road
 National secondary road

References 

Regional roads in the Republic of Ireland

Roads in County Limerick